Our Heart's Hero is the self-titled debut album from Christian pop rock band Our Heart's Hero. It was released on May 18, 2007 through Gotee Records. The album features the Christian radio singles "Back to the Cross", "Because of the Blood", and "Tomorrow".

Track listing
"Save Me" – 3:13
"Because of the Blood" – 3:06
"More Than Everything" – 3:04
"Tomorrow" – 3:47
"To Be a Hero" – 3:07
"Back to the Cross" – 3:32
"Broken" – 3:44
"Alive" – 3:17
"Every Breath" – 4:01
"Never Again" – 3:29
"Angel's Song" – 4:44

References

2007 debut albums
Gotee Records albums